This is a list of the mammal species recorded in Zambia. Of the 237 mammal species in Zambia, one is critically endangered, three are endangered, eight are vulnerable, and fourteen are near threatened.

The following tags are used to highlight each species' conservation status as assessed by the International Union for Conservation of Nature:

Some species were assessed using an earlier set of criteria. Species assessed using this system have the following instead of near threatened and least concern categories:

Order: Macroscelidea (elephant shrews) 

Often called sengis, the elephant shrews or jumping shrews are native to southern Africa. Their common English name derives from their elongated flexible snout and their resemblance to the true shrews.

Family: Macroscelididae (elephant shrews)
Genus: Elephantulus
 Short-snouted elephant shrew, Elephantulus brachyrhynchus LC
 Dusky elephant shrew, Elephantulus fuscus DD
Genus: Petrodromus
 Four-toed elephant shrew, Petrodromus tetradactylus LC
Genus: Rhynchocyon
 Checkered elephant shrew, R. cirnei

Order: Tubulidentata (aardvarks) 

The order Tubulidentata consists of a single species, the aardvark. Tubulidentata are characterised by their teeth which lack a pulp cavity and form thin tubes which are continuously worn down and replaced.

Family: Orycteropodidae
Genus: Orycteropus
 Aardvark, O. afer

Order: Hyracoidea (hyraxes) 

The hyraxes are any of four species of fairly small, thickset, herbivorous mammals in the order Hyracoidea. About the size of a domestic cat they are well-furred, with rounded bodies and a stumpy tail. They are native to Africa and the Middle East.

Family: Procaviidae (hyraxes)
Genus: Heterohyrax
 Yellow-spotted rock hyrax, Heterohyrax brucei LC
Genus: Procavia
 Cape hyrax, Procavia capensis LC

Order: Proboscidea (elephants) 

The elephants comprise three living species and are the largest living land animals.
Family: Elephantidae (elephants)
Genus: Loxodonta
African bush elephant, L. africana

Order: Primates 

The order Primates contains humans and their closest relatives: lemurs, lorisoids, tarsiers, monkeys, and apes.

 Suborder: Strepsirrhini
 Infraorder: Lemuriformes
 Superfamily: Lorisoidea
 Family: Galagidae
 Genus: Galago
 Mohol bushbaby, Galago moholi LR/lc
 Genus: Otolemur
 Brown greater galago, Otolemur crassicaudatus LR/lc
Suborder: Haplorhini
Infraorder: Simiiformes
Parvorder: Catarrhini
Superfamily: Cercopithecoidea
Genus: Chlorocebus
 Vervet monkey, Cercopithecus pygerythrus LR/lc
 Malbrouck, Cercopithecus cynosuros LR/lc
Family: Cercopithecidae (Old World monkeys)
Genus: Cercopithecus
 Red-tailed monkey, Cercopithecus ascanius LR/lc
 Blue monkey, Cercopithecus mitis LR/lc
Genus: Papio
 Yellow baboon, Papio cynocephalus LR/lc
 Chacma baboon, Papio ursinus LR/lc
Subfamily: Colobinae
Genus: Colobus
 Angola colobus, Colobus angolensis LR/lc

Order: Rodentia (rodents) 

Rodents make up the largest order of mammals, with over 40% of mammalian species. They have two incisors in the upper and lower jaw which grow continually and must be kept short by gnawing.

Suborder: Hystricognathi
Family: Bathyergidae
Genus: Cryptomys
 Ansell's mole-rat, Cryptomys anselli NT
 Bocage's mole-rat, Cryptomys bocagei DD
 Damaraland mole-rat, Cryptomys damarensis LC
 Common mole-rat, Cryptomys hottentotus LC
 Kafue mole-rat, Cryptomys kafuensis VU
 Mechow's mole-rat, Cryptomys mechowi LC
Family: Hystricidae (Old World porcupines)
Genus: Hystrix
 Cape porcupine, Hystrix africaeaustralis LC
Family: Thryonomyidae (cane rats)
Genus: Thryonomys
 Lesser cane rat, Thryonomys gregorianus LC
 Greater cane rat, Thryonomys swinderianus LC
Suborder: Sciurognathi
Family: Anomaluridae
Subfamily: Anomalurinae
Genus: Anomalurus
 Lord Derby's scaly-tailed squirrel, Anomalurus derbianus LC
Genus: Anomalurops
 Beecroft's scaly-tailed squirrel, Anomalurops beecrofti LC
Family: Pedetidae (spring hare)
Genus: Pedetes
 Springhare, Pedetes capensis LC
Family: Sciuridae (squirrels)
Subfamily: Xerinae
Tribe: Protoxerini
Genus: Heliosciurus
 Gambian sun squirrel, Heliosciurus gambianus LC
 Mutable sun squirrel, Heliosciurus mutabilis LC
Genus: Paraxerus
 Boehm's bush squirrel, Paraxerus boehmi LC
 Smith's bush squirrel, Paraxerus cepapi LC
 Black and red bush squirrel, Paraxerus lucifer DD
Family: Gliridae (dormice)
Subfamily: Graphiurinae
Genus: Graphiurus
 Johnston's African dormouse, Graphiurus johnstoni DD
 Small-eared dormouse, Graphiurus microtis LC
 Monard's dormouse, Graphiurus monardi DD
 Rock dormouse, Graphiurus platyops LC
Family: Nesomyidae
Subfamily: Dendromurinae
Genus: Dendromus
 Gray climbing mouse, Dendromus melanotis LC
 Brants's climbing mouse, Dendromus mesomelas LC
 Chestnut climbing mouse, Dendromus mystacalis LC
 Nyika climbing mouse, Dendromus nyikae LC
Genus: Steatomys
 Kreb's fat mouse, Steatomys krebsii LC
 Tiny fat mouse, Steatomys parvus LC
 Fat mouse, Steatomys pratensis LC
Subfamily: Cricetomyinae
Genus: Beamys
 Greater hamster-rat, Beamys major NT
Genus: Cricetomys
 Gambian pouched rat, Cricetomys gambianus LC
Genus: Saccostomus
 South African pouched mouse, Saccostomus campestris LC
Family: Muridae (mice, rats, voles, gerbils, hamsters, etc.)
Subfamily: Deomyinae
Genus: Acomys
 Spiny mouse, Acomys spinosissimus LC
Genus: Lophuromys
 Yellow-spotted brush-furred rat, Lophuromys flavopunctatus LC
Subfamily: Otomyinae
Genus: Otomys
 Angoni vlei rat, Otomys angoniensis LC
 Dent's vlei rat, Otomys denti NT
 Large vlei rat, Otomys maximus LC
 Uzungwe vlei rat, Otomys uzungwensis EN
Subfamily: Gerbillinae
Genus: Tatera
 Boehm's gerbil, Tatera boehmi LC
 Highveld gerbil, Tatera brantsii LC
 Bushveld gerbil, Tatera leucogaster LC
 Savanna gerbil, Tatera valida LC
Subfamily: Murinae
Genus: Aethomys
 Red rock rat, Aethomys chrysophilus LC
 Kaiser's rock rat, Aethomys kaiseri LC
 Namaqua rock rat, Aethomys namaquensis LC
 Nyika rock rat, Aethomys nyikae LC
Genus: Arvicanthis
 African grass rat, Arvicanthis niloticus LC
Genus: Colomys
 African wading rat, Colomys goslingi LC
Genus: Dasymys
 African marsh rat, Dasymys incomtus LC
 Angolan marsh rat, Dasymys nudipes NT
Genus: Grammomys
 Woodland thicket rat, Grammomys dolichurus LC
 Ruwenzori thicket rat, Grammomys ibeanus LC
Genus: Hybomys
 Peters's striped mouse, Hybomys univittatus LC
Genus: Hylomyscus
 Montane wood mouse, Hylomyscus denniae LC
Genus: Lemniscomys
 Griselda's striped grass mouse, Lemniscomys griselda LC
 Single-striped grass mouse, Lemniscomys rosalia LC
 Rosevear's striped grass mouse, Lemniscomys roseveari DD
 Typical striped grass mouse, Lemniscomys striatus LC
Genus: Malacomys
 Big-eared swamp rat, Malacomys longipes LC
Genus: Mastomys
 Natal multimammate mouse, Mastomys natalensis LC
Genus: Mus
 Desert pygmy mouse, Mus indutus LC
 African pygmy mouse, Mus minutoides LC
 Neave's mouse, Mus neavei DD
 Setzer's pygmy mouse, Mus setzeri LC
 Gray-bellied pygmy mouse, Mus triton LC
Genus: Pelomys
 Creek groove-toothed swamp rat, Pelomys fallax LC
 Least groove-toothed swamp rat, Pelomys minor LC
Genus: Praomys
 Delectable soft-furred mouse, Praomys delectorum NT
 Jackson's soft-furred mouse, Praomys jacksoni LC
Genus: Rhabdomys
 Four-striped grass mouse, Rhabdomys pumilio LC
Genus: Thallomys
 Black-tailed tree rat, Thallomys nigricauda LC
 Acacia rat, Thallomys paedulcus LC
Genus: Zelotomys
 Hildegarde's broad-headed mouse, Zelotomys hildegardeae LC

Order: Lagomorpha (lagomorphs) 

The lagomorphs comprise two families, Leporidae (hares and rabbits), and Ochotonidae (pikas). Though they can resemble rodents, and were classified as a superfamily in that order until the early twentieth century, they have since been considered a separate order. They differ from rodents in a number of physical characteristics, such as having four incisors in the upper jaw rather than two.

Family: Leporidae (rabbits, hares)
Genus: Pronolagus
 Smith's red rock hare, Pronolagus rupestris LR/lc
Genus: Lepus
 Cape hare, Lepus capensis LR/lc
 African savanna hare, Lepus microtis LR/lc

Order: Soricomorpha (shrews, moles, and solenodons) 

The "shrew-forms" are insectivorous mammals. The shrews and solenodons closely resemble mice while the moles are stout-bodied burrowers.

Family: Soricidae (shrews)
Subfamily: Crocidurinae
Genus: Crocidura
 Ansell's shrew, Crocidura ansellorum EN
 Reddish-gray musk shrew, Crocidura cyanea LC
 Bicolored musk shrew, Crocidura fuscomurina LC
 Lesser red musk shrew, Crocidura hirta LC
 Moonshine shrew, Crocidura luna LC
 Swamp musk shrew, Crocidura mariquensis LC
 African black shrew, Crocidura nigrofusca LC
 African giant shrew, Crocidura olivieri LC
 Small-footed shrew, Crocidura parvipes LC
 Pitman's shrew, Crocidura pitmani DD
 Lesser gray-brown musk shrew, Crocidura silacea LC
 Turbo shrew, Crocidura turba LC
Genus: Suncus
 Greater dwarf shrew, Suncus lixus LC
 Lesser dwarf shrew, Suncus varilla LC
Genus: Sylvisorex
 Climbing shrew, Sylvisorex megalura LC

Order: Chiroptera (bats) 

The bats' most distinguishing feature is that their forelimbs are developed as wings, making them the only mammals capable of flight. Bat species account for about 20% of all mammals.
Family: Pteropodidae (flying foxes, Old World fruit bats)
Subfamily: Pteropodinae
Genus: Eidolon
 Straw-coloured fruit bat, Eidolon helvum LC
Genus: Epomophorus
 Peters's epauletted fruit bat, Epomophorus crypturus LC
 Wahlberg's epauletted fruit bat, Epomophorus wahlbergi LC
Genus: Epomops
 Dobson's epauletted fruit bat, Epomops dobsoni LC
 Franquet's epauletted fruit bat, Epomops franqueti LC
Genus: Lissonycteris
 Angolan rousette, Lissonycteris angolensis LC
 Harrison's fruit bat, Lissonycteris goliath VU
Genus: Micropteropus
 Peters's dwarf epauletted fruit bat, Micropteropus pusillus LC
Genus: Plerotes
 D'Anchieta's fruit bat, Plerotes anchietae DD
Genus: Rousettus
 Egyptian fruit bat, Rousettus aegyptiacus LC
Family: Vespertilionidae
Subfamily: Kerivoulinae
Genus: Kerivoula
 Damara woolly bat, Kerivoula argentata LC
 Lesser woolly bat, Kerivoula lanosa LC
Subfamily: Myotinae
Genus: Myotis
 Rufous mouse-eared bat, Myotis bocagii LC
 Cape hairy bat, Myotis tricolor LC
 Welwitsch's bat, Myotis welwitschii LC
Subfamily: Vespertilioninae
Genus: Eptesicus
 Long-tailed house bat, Eptesicus hottentotus LC
Genus: Glauconycteris
 Butterfly bat, Glauconycteris variegata LC
Genus: Hypsugo
 Anchieta's pipistrelle, Hypsugo anchietae LC
Genus: Laephotis
 Botswanan long-eared bat, Laephotis botswanae LC
Genus: Mimetillus
 Moloney's mimic bat, Mimetillus moloneyi LC
Genus: Neoromicia
 Cape serotine, Neoromicia capensis LC
 Melck's house bat, Neoromicia melckorum DD
 Banana pipistrelle, Neoromicia nanus LC
 Rendall's serotine, Neoromicia rendalli LC
 Zulu serotine, Neoromicia zuluensis LC
Genus: Nycticeinops
 Schlieffen's bat, Nycticeinops schlieffeni LC
Genus: Pipistrellus
 Rüppell's pipistrelle, Pipistrellus rueppelli LC
 Rusty pipistrelle, Pipistrellus rusticus LC
Genus: Scotoecus
 White-bellied lesser house bat, Scotoecus albigula DD
 Hinde's lesser house bat, Scotoecus hindei DD
 Dark-winged lesser house bat, Scotoecus hirundo DD
Genus: Scotophilus
 African yellow bat, Scotophilus dinganii LC
 White-bellied yellow bat, Scotophilus leucogaster LC
 Greenish yellow bat, Scotophilus viridis LC
Subfamily: Miniopterinae
Genus: Miniopterus
 Lesser long-fingered bat, Miniopterus fraterculus LC
 Natal long-fingered bat, Miniopterus natalensis NT
Family: MolossidaeGenus: Chaerephon Spotted free-tailed bat, Chaerephon bivittata LC
 Nigerian free-tailed bat, Chaerephon nigeriae LC
 Little free-tailed bat, Chaerephon pumila LC
Genus: Mops Angolan free-tailed bat, Mops condylurus LC
 Midas free-tailed bat, Mops midas LC
 White-bellied free-tailed bat, Mops niveiventer LC
Genus: Otomops Large-eared free-tailed bat, Otomops martiensseni NT
Genus: Tadarida Egyptian free-tailed bat, Tadarida aegyptiaca LC
 Madagascan large free-tailed bat, Tadarida fulminans LC
 African giant free-tailed bat, Tadarida ventralis NT
Family: Emballonuridae
Genus: Taphozous Mauritian tomb bat, Taphozous mauritianus LC
Family: Nycteridae
Genus: Nycteris Andersen's slit-faced bat, Nycteris aurita DD
 Large slit-faced bat, Nycteris grandis LC
 Hairy slit-faced bat, Nycteris hispida LC
 Large-eared slit-faced bat, Nycteris macrotis LC
 Ja slit-faced bat, Nycteris major VU
 Egyptian slit-faced bat, Nycteris thebaica LC
 Wood's slit-faced bat, Nycteris woodi NT
Family: Megadermatidae
Genus: Lavia Yellow-winged bat, Lavia frons LC
Family: Rhinolophidae
Subfamily: Rhinolophinae
Genus: RhinolophusBlasius's horseshoe bat, R. blasii 
 Geoffroy's horseshoe bat, Rhinolophus clivosus LC
 Darling's horseshoe bat, Rhinolophus darlingi LC
 Rüppell's horseshoe bat, Rhinolophus fumigatus LC
 Hildebrandt's horseshoe bat, Rhinolophus hildebrandti LC
 Lander's horseshoe bat, Rhinolophus landeri LC
 Sakeji horseshoe bat, Rhinolophus sakejiensis DD
 Bushveld horseshoe bat, Rhinolophus simulator LC
 Swinny's horseshoe bat, Rhinolophus swinnyi NT
Subfamily: Hipposiderinae
Genus: Cloeotis Percival's trident bat, Cloeotis percivali VU
Genus: Hipposideros Sundevall's roundleaf bat, Hipposideros caffer LC
 Commerson's roundleaf bat, Hipposideros marungensis NT
 Noack's roundleaf bat, Hipposideros ruber LC
Genus: Triaenops Persian trident bat, Triaenops persicus LC

 Order: Pholidota (pangolins) 

The order Pholidota comprises the eight species of pangolin. Pangolins are anteaters and have the powerful claws, elongated snout and long tongue seen in the other unrelated anteater species.

Family: Manidae
Genus: Manis Ground pangolin, Manis temminckii LR/nt
 Tree pangolin, Manis tricuspis LR/lc

 Order: Carnivora (carnivorans) 

There are over 260 species of carnivorans, the majority of which feed primarily on meat. They have a characteristic skull shape and dentition.
Suborder: Feliformia
Family: Felidae (cats)
Subfamily: Felinae
Genus: AcinonyxCheetah, Acinonyx jubatus VU
Southeast African cheetah, A.j. jubatus CR
Genus: Caracal Caracal, Caracal caracal LC
Genus: FelisAfrican wildcat, F. lybica , possibly resident
Genus: Leptailurus Serval, Leptailurus serval LC
Subfamily: Pantherinae
Genus: PantheraLion, Panthera leo VUPanthera leo melanochaitaLeopard, Panthera pardus VU
African leopard, P.p. pardusFamily: Viverridae
Subfamily: Viverrinae
Genus: CivettictisAfrican civet, C. civetta 
Genus: Genetta Angolan genet, Genetta angolensis LC
 Common genet, Genetta genetta LC
 Rusty-spotted genet, Genetta maculata LC
Family: Nandiniidae
Genus: Nandinia African palm civet, Nandinia binotata LC
Family: Herpestidae (mongooses)
Genus: Atilax Marsh mongoose, Atilax paludinosus LC
Genus: BdeogaleBushy-tailed mongoose, B. crassicauda 
Genus: Helogale Common dwarf mongoose, Helogale parvula LC
Genus: Herpestes Egyptian mongoose, Herpestes ichneumon LC
Common slender mongoose, Herpestes sanguineus LC
Genus: IchneumiaWhite-tailed mongoose, I. albicauda 
Genus: Mungos Banded mongoose, Mungos mungo LC
Genus: Paracynictis Selous' mongoose, Paracynictis selousi LC
Genus: Rhynchogale Meller's mongoose, Rhynchogale melleri LC
Family: Hyaenidae (hyaenas)
Genus: Crocuta Spotted hyena, Crocuta crocuta LC
Genus: Proteles Aardwolf, Proteles cristatus LC
Suborder: Caniformia
Family: Canidae (dogs, foxes)
Genus: Lupulella Side-striped jackal, L. adusta  
Genus: Lycaon African wild dog, L. pictus EN
Family: Mustelidae (mustelids)
Genus: Ictonyx Striped polecat, I. striatus LC
Genus: Poecilogale African striped weasel, P. albinucha LC
Genus: MellivoraHoney badger, M. capensis 
Genus: Lutra Speckle-throated otter, L. maculicollis LC
Genus: Aonyx African clawless otter, A. capensis LC

 Order: Perissodactyla (odd-toed ungulates) 

The odd-toed ungulates are browsing and grazing mammals. They are usually large to very large, and have relatively simple stomachs and a large middle toe.

Family: Equidae (horses etc.)
Genus: Equus Grant's zebra, Equus quagga boehmi LC
Family: Rhinocerotidae
Genus: Diceros South-central black rhinoceros, Diceros bicornis minor CR
Genus: Ceratotherium Southern white rhinoceros, Ceratotherium simum simum NT

 Order: Artiodactyla (even-toed ungulates) 

The even-toed ungulates are ungulates whose weight is borne about equally by the third and fourth toes, rather than mostly or entirely by the third as in perissodactyls. There are about 220 artiodactyl species, including many that are of great economic importance to humans.
Family: Suidae (pigs)
Subfamily: Phacochoerinae
Genus: Phacochoerus Common warthog, Phacochoerus africanus LR/lc
Subfamily: Suinae
Genus: Potamochoerus Bushpig, Potamochoerus larvatus LR/lc
Family: Hippopotamidae (hippopotamuses)
Genus: Hippopotamus Hippopotamus, Hippopotamus amphibius VU
Family: Giraffidae (giraffe, okapi)
Genus: Giraffa South African giraffe, Giraffa giraffa giraffa VU
 Masai giraffe, Giraffa tippelskirchi VU
 Rhodesian giraffe, Giraffa camelopardalis thornicrofti VU
Family: Bovidae (cattle, antelope, sheep, goats)
Subfamily: Alcelaphinae
Genus: Alcelaphus Lichtenstein's hartebeest, Alcelaphus lichtensteinii LR/cd
Genus: Connochaetes Blue wildebeest, Connochaetes taurinus LR/cd
Genus: Damaliscus Topi, Damaliscus lunatus LR/cd
Subfamily: Antilopinae
Genus: Oreotragus Klipspringer, Oreotragus oreotragus LR/cd
Genus: Ourebia Oribi, Ourebia ourebi LR/cd
Genus: Raphicerus Steenbok, Raphicerus campestris LR/lc
 Sharpe's grysbok, Raphicerus sharpei LR/cd
Subfamily: Bovinae
Genus: SyncerusAfrican buffalo, S. caffer 
Genus: Tragelaphus Common eland, Tragelaphus oryx LR/cd
 Bushbuck, Tragelaphus scriptus LR/lc
 Sitatunga, Tragelaphus spekii LR/nt
 Greater kudu, Tragelaphus strepsiceros LR/cd
Subfamily: Cephalophinae
Genus: Cephalophus Blue duiker, Cephalophus monticola LR/lc
 Red forest duiker, Cephalophus natalensis LR/cd
 Yellow-backed duiker, Cephalophus silvicultor LR/nt
Genus: Sylvicapra Common duiker, Sylvicapra grimmia LR/lc
Subfamily: Hippotraginae
Genus: Hippotragus Roan antelope, Hippotragus equinus LR/cd
 Sable antelope, Hippotragus niger LR/cd
Subfamily: Aepycerotinae
Genus: Aepyceros Impala, Aepyceros melampus LR/cd
Subfamily: Reduncinae
Genus: Kobus Waterbuck, Kobus ellipsiprymnus LR/cd
 Lechwe, Kobus leche LR/cd
 Puku, Kobus vardonii LR/cd
Genus: Redunca Southern reedbuck, Redunca arundinum'' LR/cd

See also
List of chordate orders
Lists of mammals by region
List of prehistoric mammals
Mammal classification
List of mammals described in the 2000s

Notes

References
 

Zambia
Zambia
Mammals